Thomas Roger Berkelman (born May 2, 1949) is an American politician who served in the Minnesota House of Representatives from 1977 to 1983

Education 
Berkelman earned a Bachelor of Arts degree in history and political science from University of Minnesota Duluth in 1971 and his master's degree in public communications and political science from California State University, Long Beach in 1973. Berkelman also studied at the European Study Center in Luxembourg.

Career 
Berkelman worked for Duluth Public and Industrial Relations and for the Anderson-Ryan Company. Berkelman served in the Minnesota House of Representatives from 1977 to 1983 and was a Democrat.

Personal life 
He was married to Kathleen A. Blatz who also served in the Minnesota Legislature; they were then divorced.

References

1949 births
Living people
Businesspeople from Minnesota
Politicians from Duluth, Minnesota
California State University, Long Beach alumni
University of Minnesota Duluth alumni
Democratic Party members of the Minnesota House of Representatives